Android One: The Reactor Run is a shoot 'em up maze video game written by Mark Haigh-Hutchinson and published by Vortex Software in 1983 for the ZX Spectrum and in 1985 for the Amstrad CPC.

A sequel, Android Two, was released later in 1983.

Gameplay
The aim of the game is to destroy the reactor before the reactor destroys everything. This is done via blasting through walls, avoiding debris, and fighting mutants with your Android.

The maze is presented in a scrolling top-down view, using tile based graphics.

Reception

References

1983 video games
Amstrad CPC games
Maze games
Shoot 'em ups
Video games developed in the United Kingdom
Vortex Software games
ZX Spectrum games